Noriūnai Manor is a former residential manor in Noriūnai village, Kupiškis district in Lithuania. The Manor complex was started in 1665 and consists of the main building, farm laborers outbuildings and park.

References

Manor houses in Lithuania
Classicism architecture in Lithuania